Roald Muggerud (born 12 December 1931) is a Norwegian footballer. He played in four matches for the Norway national football team from 1958 to 1960.

References

External links
 

1931 births
Living people
Norwegian footballers
Norway international footballers
Place of birth missing (living people)
Association footballers not categorized by position